Petroleum University or University of Petroleum may refer to:
China University of Petroleum, Dongying, Shandong
Federal University of Petroleum Resource Effurun, Delta State, Nigeria
King Fahd University of Petroleum and Minerals, Dhahran, Saudi Arabia
Liaoning University of Petroleum and Chemical Technology, Fushun, Liaoning, China
Pandit Deendayal Petroleum University, Raisan, Gandhinagar, Gujarat, India
Petroleum University of Technology, Abadan, Iran
Southwest Petroleum University, Chengdu, Sichuan, China
University of Petroleum and Energy Studies, Dehradun, Uttarakhand, India
Ufa State Petroleum Technological University, Ufa, Republic of Bashkortostan, Russia